The Norinco NRP9 was introduced at IWA in 2014. It is a double-action revolver with a transfer bar and external manual safety. The NRP9 is chambered in a proprietary cartridge similar to .38 S&W, which is designed to prevent unauthorized criminal use.

References

中国NRP9型9mm警用转轮手枪

Double-action revolvers
Police weapons
Firearms of the People's Republic of China
Norinco